The tiny-house movement is an architectural and social movement that advocates for downsizing living spaces, simplifying, and essentially "living with less." According to the 2018 International Residential Code, Appendix Q Tiny Houses, a tiny house is a "dwelling unit with a maximum of 37 square metres (400 sq ft) of floor area, excluding lofts." The term "tiny house" is sometimes used interchangeably with "micro-house". While tiny housing primarily represents a return to simpler living, the movement was also regarded as a potential eco-friendly solution to the existing housing industry, as well as a feasible transitional option for individuals experiencing a lack of shelter. Some states in the U.S. consider any home under 1,000 sq. ft. to be a tiny (or micro) home expanding the offerings for many eager enthusiasts. 

This distinction is important as many people look to place tiny houses on empty lots, however if a tiny house lacks any one of the necessary amenities required for a dwelling unit then it is an accessory structure and must be placed on the same lot as a primary structure per the 2018 International Residential Code. There are a variety of reasons for living in a tiny house. Many people who enter this lifestyle rethink what they value in life and decide to put more effort into strengthening their communities, healing the environment, spending time with their families, or saving money.

Background
Increased material wealth and individuals with high incomes are common reasons why home sizes increased.

History

The precursor to the Tiny House was the shotgun shack, a small, narrow single-story building in widespread use among urban black Americans from the late 19th century until the Great Depression of the 1930s. Although few of these houses had more than two bedrooms, they provided accommodation for entire blue collar families in Southern United States cities like New Orleans.

Henry David Thoreau and the publication of his book Walden are often quoted as early inspiration. The modern movement is considered by some to have started in the 1970s, with artists such as Allan Wexler investigating the concept of choosing to live in a compact space. Early pioneers include Lloyd Kahn, author of Shelter (1973) and Lester Walker, author of Tiny Houses (1987). Sarah Susanka started the "counter movement" for smaller houses which she details in her book The Not So Big House (1997).

Jay Shafer...built his first tiny house in Iowa, in 1999, and lived in it for five years. It was a hundred and ten square feet [10 m2], with a steep gabled roof and a porch.
Tiny houses on wheels were popularized by Jay Shafer who designed and lived in a  house and later went on to offer the first plans for tiny houses on wheels, initially founding Tumbleweed Tiny House Company, and then Four Lights Tiny House Company on September 6, 2012.  In 2002, Shafer co-founded, along with Greg Johnson, Shay Salomon and Nigel Valdez, the Small House Society.  Salomon and Valdez subsequently published their guide to the modern Small House Movement, Little House on a Small Planet (2006) and Johnson published his memoir, Put Your Life on a Diet (2008).

With the Great Recession hitting the world's economy from 2007 to 2009, the small house movement attracted more attention as it offered affordable, ecologically friendly housing. Overall,  it represented a very small part of real estate transactions. Small houses are also used as accessory dwelling units (or ADUs), to serve as additional on-property housing for aging relatives or returning children, as a home office, or as a guest house. Tiny houses typically cost about $20,000 to $50,000 as of 2012.

Tiny houses have received considerable media coverage including a television show, Tiny House Nation, in 2014 and Tiny House Hunters.  Bryce Langston from New Zealand created and hosts a YouTube channel that features international tiny homes and eco-friendly living, called Living Big in a Tiny House

Tiny houses on wheels are often compared to RVs. However, tiny homes are held to state/provincial/territorial building codes. Park model RVs are held to standards set by the Standards Council of Canada or RV Industry Association (RVIA). Tiny houses are built to last as long as traditional homes, use traditional building techniques and materials, and are aesthetically similar to larger homes.

Outside the United States

While the movement is most active in America, interest in tiny homes has been observed in other developed countries.

In Australia some interest commenced through designers such as Fred Schultz and builders such as Designer Eco Tiny Homes, Designer Eco Tiny Homes is Australia's largest tiny home builder and has been at the forefront of the tiny home movement in Australia since 2016. Owned by Grant Emans and running out of 2 factories in Ulladulla on the south coast of NSW, Designer Eco Tiny Homes employees over 40 people and makes 100 tiny homes per year. In 2022 Designer Eco Tiny Homes opened the world's first tiny home showroom and also added a new tiny home model to its list, which at 9.6 metres long is the longest, tiny home in Australia. and TechnoPODS. T.I.T.A.N. Hills along Victoria's scenic Great Ocean Road, is the world's first master-planned, ecological, off-grid, tiny home subdivision.
In Canada, the legality of tiny homes can depend on the location and whether the home is mobile or stationary. In Toronto, a tiny house requires a building permit and connection to the grid. In December 2019, Edmonton introduced bylaws allowing tiny homes on foundations, removing the former 5.5-metre minimum-width requirement. Some municipalities consider buildings which are not connected to city electricity and sewerage systems to violate their building codes. This has been described by some as an attempt to avoid situations similar to the Leaky Condo Crisis in British Columbia, which resulted in the establishment of stricter building codes. Similarly, some mobile tiny homes have been rejected from spaces designed for RVs due to the property not meeting the same criteria the vehicles are held to. An "eco-village" of homes under  in Okotoks known as the Homestead Project was proposed in 2017 but met opposition from some Okotoks residents. In August 2019 the council voted not to consider the project further after deciding to honour a petition with 3,000 signatures opposed to the development.
In September 2019 in France, the “Ty Village” has open its door at 6 km from the nearby University of Saint Brieuc in the department of Bretagne.
 In Germany, the community of Vauban created 5000 households on an old military base in Freiburg. The planned density of the building on that area is of 50 dwelling units per acre. Also in Germany, British architect Richard Horden and the Technical University of Munich developed the Micro Compact Home (M-CH), a high-end small cube, designed for 1–2 persons, with functional spaces for cooking, hygiene, dining/working, and sleeping.
In New Zealand, company-built units are called mobile homes and tiny houses on wheels. As of 2021, it tends to be a grass-roots initiative with many bespoke and customized. Bryce Langston, a film-maker with a passion for small space design, permaculture, and downsized, eco-friendly living has created short, documentary-style videos on small space living for YouTube via his channel and website 'Living Big in a Tiny House'.
 In Barcelona, Spain, Eva Prats and Ricardo Flores (Flores & Prats) presented the  House in a Suitcase.
In Sweden, a chef couple launched a Kickstarter and then began a new forest to table movement called Stedsans in the Woods out of tiny home cabins for rent in a Swedish forest. They share the blueprints for their A Frame cabins.
 In the United Kingdom, Tiny Eco Homes UK has developed several customisable tiny house models starting at £26,000. Dozens of the homes are being used as primary residences across the UK and mainland Europe. The estimated cost for the Nesthouse is €55,000. Northern Ireland has also seen a small but growing community of tiny house owners, although the planning rules do not specifically accommodate tiny houses, meaning that "the planning process (for a tiny house) would need to be looked at on a case-by-case basis".

In Brazil, Tiny Houses Brasil is the first mini-house factory in the country, in a shed on a farm in Porangaba, São Paulo. The company develops projects and builds mini houses on wheels. The tiny houses are customized and built by hand with values of R$90,000.

Issues

The popularity of tiny houses has led to an increase in amateur builders which has raised concerns regarding safety among tiny house professionals. In 2013, the Tiny House Fair at Yestermorrow in Vermont was organized by Elaine Walker. An attendee at the event, Jay Shafer, suggested promoting ethical business practices and offering guidelines for construction of tiny houses on wheels. Walker continued this effort in 2015, creating the non-profit organization, American Tiny House Association.

One of the biggest obstacles of the tiny house movement is the difficulty in finding a place to live in one. Zoning regulations typically specify minimum square footage for new construction on a foundation, and for tiny houses on wheels, parking on one's own land may be prohibited by local regulations against "camping." While tiny houses do save on some costs, they can still be expensive depending on the cost of the land they occupy.

In addition, RV parks do not always allow tiny houses unless they meet the criteria required for RVs. Tiny houses on wheels are considered RVs and are not suitable for permanent residence, according to the Recreational Vehicle Industry Association. From RV Business, "The RVIA will continue to shy away from allowing members who produce products that are referred to as "tiny houses" or "tiny homes". (However, the RVIA does allow "tiny home" builders to join as long as their units are built to RV or  park-model RV standards.)" 

Lower court decisions in the US have struck down zoning laws related to size that were an obstacle to tiny housing. One of those cases was League of South Jersey, Inc v. Township of Berlin, where the court found that a zoning law related to the size of a home did not protect citizens, so the law was struck down. These decisions are still far from being the majority, but they help in allowing the propagation of the tiny housing movement.

In 2014, the first "tiny house friendly town" was declared in Spur, Texas; however, it was later clarified that a tiny house may not be on wheels but must be secured to a foundation.

In July 2016, Washington County, Utah revised their zoning regulations to accommodate some types of tiny houses.

Increasingly, tiny houses have become larger, heavier, and more expensive. The ideal of minimal impact on the environment is not a priority for all home-owners as businesses capitalize on the popularity of tiny homes.

Tiny houses have been noted as impractical spaces to raise families in. Overcrowding and lack of space have been noted to be detrimental to both physical and mental health, and can affect school performance.

In New Zealand, some district councils have sought to classify mobile homes and tiny homes on wheels as buildings, subject to the Building Act 2004. This was backed by the Ministry of Business, Innovation and Employment (MBIE) in a determination that was then challenged in District Court (Dall v MBIE). Judge Callaghan gave a scathing ruling that accepted Dall's argument that his home was not a building, and the council and MBIE erred in saying it was. Since then other cases have been heard, but as of January 2021, no clarity has been forthcoming from Government.

Housing for the homeless

The financial crisis of 2007–08 fueled the growth of the small house movement. In several cities, an entrenched homeless population formed around tent cities, encampments that became semi-permanent housing. Homelessness in these communities was driven by foreclosures and expensive mortgages from the United States housing bubble.

Tiny houses became an affordable option for individuals who lost their homes. With their low cost and relative ease of construction, tiny houses are being adopted as shelters for the homeless in Eugene, OR; Olympia, WA; Ithaca, NY; and other cities. Communities of tiny houses offer residents a transition towards self-sufficiency. Communities such as Othello Village in Seattle, WA, originally lacked electricity and heat. In Seattle, non-profits have stepped in to help provide amenities.

Housing the homeless is said to be cost-saving for municipalities. The long-term viability of tiny houses for homeless people is completely dependent on the structure and sustainability of the model. Strict zoning and land ownership laws make it difficult for this movement to take root. Benefits of access to housing include privacy, storage, safety, restoration of dignity and stability.

In Reno, Nevada, faith-based groups and community advocates have legislated new zoning for housing of homeless people in a tiny home community. Each tiny house would cost an estimated $3,800 to build, as well as an operating budget of $270,000 for case managers to help residents find more permanent housing and a project manager position. A village of 21 tiny homes is planned to open in 2023 for the chronically homeless in Worcester, Massachusetts.

One challenge besides zoning and funding has been a NIMBY response by communities. Communities may weigh concerns over tiny home communities becoming shantytowns or blighted neighborhoods that reduce property values of the surrounding neighborhoods. For cities such as Chicago, tiny houses are seen as an appealing option to close the gap in housing availability. Community planners also have concerns that communities don't devolve into shantytowns such as during the Great Depression in "Hoovervilles".

In California, the city of Richmond has engaged University of California, Berkeley students in the THIMBY (Tiny House In My Backyard) project with a pilot program for developing a model of six transitional tiny homes to be placed in the city. THIMBY, with the support of Sustainable Housing at California, aims to foster an environment that allows homeowners and transitional housing residents to live as neighbors rather than in a landlord-tenant relationship. THIMBY acquires target locations for tiny housing development through surveying interested homeowners offering to rent out backyard space for the tiny housing unit. While Sustainable Housing at California has independently scouted out interested individuals for the initial pilot project, the organization also aims to work closely with the City of Richmond’s Tiny House on Wheels ordinance to bolster city-level efforts to provide affordable housing and shelter. This is in line with developing efforts in the San Francisco Bay Area to use micro-apartments and tiny houses in combating the housing crisis and homelessness in the San Francisco Bay Area. Similar efforts of using tiny houses to house the homeless are also ongoing in Oakland through a partnership between the City of Oakland and Laney College. In 2021, the California based nonprofit organization Hope of the Valley funded and built 4 tiny home villages in Los Angeles, the first formal, legally uncontested tiny home project in the region. More informal efforts to build tiny homes for homeless communities had been made in the past by citizens in Los Angeles, but were ultimately seized by the city due to concerns over sanitation.

In Edinburgh UK the Social Enterprise Social Bite asked Jonathan Avery of Tiny House Scotland to design a variation of his NestHouse tiny house to create a two bedroom version for its Homeless Tiny House Village in the Granton area of Edinburgh. The village was opened on May 17, 2018 by the Scottish Cabinet Secretary for Communities, Social Security and Equalities, Angela Constance MSP and features eleven NestHouse Duo tiny houses and a community hub building all built by Carbon Dynamic.

Pros and cons
In the co-authored research article The Psychology of Home Environments, it's argued that the drive behind the tiny house movement is centered around desires of modesty and conservation, in addition to environmental consciousness, self-sufficiency, and wanting a life of adventure. In building tiny houses, there is often a misalignment between the needs of the occupant(s), and the expressed design from the creating team. This reality is used as a call for architects and design teams to work with psychologists to build tiny homes that are better suited towards the needs of the occupant(s). In understanding these considerations, it is important to note that not everyone is suited for a tiny house.

Smaller homes are less expensive than larger ones in terms of taxes and building, heating, maintenance, and repair costs. The lower cost of living may be advantageous to those with little savings, such as people aged 55 and older. In addition to costing less, small houses may encourage a less cluttered, simpler lifestyle, and reduce ecological impacts for their residents. The typical size of a small home seldom exceeds .

Small houses may emphasize design over size, utilize dual purpose features and multi-functional furniture, and incorporate technological advances of space saving equipment and appliances. Vertical space optimization is also a common feature of small houses and apartments. An example of this is the use of loft spaces for sleeping and storage. Because of overall height restrictions related to the ability to easily tow a tiny house, it is common for lofts to be between 3.3 ft and 5.5 ft (1.0m and 1.7m) inside height. Therefore, for accessibility of elderly and disabled people, larger floor plans that keep essential elements like bed, bathroom and kitchen on the main floor are more typical.

The increased utilization of small houses as second homes or retirement houses may lead to development of more land. People interested in building a small home can encounter institutional “discrimination” when building codes require minimum size well above the size of a small home. Also, neighbors may be hostile because they fear negative impacts on their property values and have concerns about increased taxes.

More broadly, these sentiments of "othering" homeless and unhoused persons have culminated into a broader movement of NIMBY-ism, or "Not in My Backyard."

The advent of NIMBY-ism occupied much of community organizing and housing advocacy dialogue in the 1980s, so much that some coined it “the populist political philosophy of the 1980s.” In many ways, NIMBY philosophy functions through the “spatialization of stigma,” allowing residents and homeowners to reallocate and redefine neighborhoods and local communities and, consequently, which individuals should be allowed to occupy such an area. While modern U.S. society has statistically experienced a growing need for human services and welfare, researchers have acknowledged that “The stigmatization of persons and places are thus mutually constitutive of community rejection and organized resistance to human service facility sitting.” In effect, community resistance to housing advocacy and affordability measures further exacerbates the dwindling number of public resources and social services available to vulnerable and displaced homeless persons.

Concerns over the efficacy of tiny homes for homeless people persist. Some critics have argued that, similar to other forms of anti-homelessness legislation, tiny home villages are fundamentally carceral, designed to push its tenants into less public spaces near city outskirts in an effort to invisibilize homeless people, rather than provide long-term stability.

By treating homelessness as a non-familiarized issue, residents and homeowners are effectively exempt from community obligations towards the well-being and sheltering of other community members experiencing homelessness. Despite the framing of housing as a fundamental rights-based issue, community perspectives have evolved towards a more economic, individualized form that correlates a person’s home-ownership and housing to their values and ethics, employ-ability, and general ability to provide for themselves and their families. As such, the inability of both private and public sectors to supplement the widening gap of affordable housing options and shelter is, in some ways, conveniently explained by an individual’s supposed inability to ensure living stability, maintain financial independence, and solidify their position within the society at large.

Electrical setup and grid impacts 
Tiny homes are threatening increased grid defection because of their inherently low energy demands due to their small size. Their customized builds and smaller energy demand often lend themselves toward dependence on rooftop photovoltaics such as roof-mounted solar panels. Especially with the continuously decreasing price of solar panels and batteries, tiny homes are examples of existing and commercially proven alternative off-grid housing.

Off-grid solar electrical system 

Each space and house will have their own energy consumption profile and generation demand. Consequently, they must size their power equipment accordingly. The needed size of battery systems to store captured energy or grid-supplied energy that will be used during times without power production from the rooftop solar, such as when there is inadequate insolation, depend on the generation capacity (as to not under or oversize the battery bank), the type of batteries used, their individual capacity (A⋅h), the discharge rate allowable per cycle (%), the size of loads (W), how long they will be run, and how many days of storage are needed. Battery sizing calculators are available online to simplify this process. Additionally, battery balancers, sensors that can read and recalibrate the available capacity, or state of charge, between different battery cells, can be added to extend the life of a battery system to prohibit voltage offset or non-ideal current flow, potentially damaging or capacity reducing to batteries over time. Batteries are rated in terms of ampere-hours with their discharge rate and capacity set by the manufacturer at a specific current and total amount of time, as voltage differs with temperature and power will vary with rate of discharge.

To fully convert a tiny home for living capacities off-grid, other power electronic power equipment is necessary, such as a charge controller, an inverter to power AC loads or down-regulators for DC loads, and proper protection devices such as circuit breakers and fuses. Specific sine inverters may offer simultaneous grid power hookup, called 'grid-tie inverters' in case of insufficient energy generation locally. Grid-tie inverters are of academic interest and are being studied by utilities for their impacts and potential benefits to voltage regulation, infrastructure implications, protection schema requirements, economics, and optimum policy regarding integration for implementation into the electrical grid with the rise of distributed generation, namely residential supplied solar power.

Size of homes
Considering the small size of tiny homes in comparison to that of average-sized homes, energy costs are invariably smaller; moreover, tiny home power grids are typically sourced from solar panels, which decreases the amount of publicly produced energy necessary to sustain the home. More importantly, the price difference of using solar power on a tiny home in comparison to an average-sized home, not decrease significantly the homeowner expenses. Thus, the variation of energy emissions and cost necessary for output between a tiny home and average-sized home varies notably.

Consequently, tiny homes inevitably require the consumption of less energy to support the homeowner. As a result, people living in tiny homes typically limit the accumulation of materialistic items. The limited space of a tiny home insists that owners sacrifice the idea of abundant materialism. It also allows homeowners to re-evaluate their personal habits, which subsequently translates into awareness regarding environmental sourcing. The concept of a “tiny” home reflects all aspects of the chosen lifestyle; a minimized space necessitates minimal consumer spending while the limited amount of surface area provided decreases the rate and level of energy consumption.

Environmentally conscious design
Human beings have been the main contributors in recent environmental changes. One critical proponent of these changes relates to infrastructure; buildings affect both human beings and the environment. However the costs tend to effect the environment while the benefits are exclusive to humans. The intention of building new infrastructure is to guarantee its sustainability for a long period of time. As a result, the less environmentally intentional a facility is, the more it will depend on consumption of natural resources. “Part of the very definition of a tiny home is that it be constructed with environmentally conscious and renewable materials.” Most tiny homes are designed to receive their services in ways that are less environmentally exhaustible. Electrical grids and public utilities are a distinguishable way tiny homes receive various water, electric and plumbing services. This detail is critical for consideration when individuals move from average sized homes to tiny homes because it allows individuals to both save money while using less environmental resources. Another important environmentally conscious feature relates to toilets. Some tiny homes are equipped with incinerator toilets which get rid of waste by burning it rather than flushing. By eliminating toilet flushing, the amount of water used in a household significantly decreases. An alternative feature is a compost toilet which works by decomposing the waste using evaporation to remove it. Therefore, not only are tiny homes energy efficient, the makeup of these homes are also intended to be environmentally friendly. Subsequently, in order for new materials to be both utilized in construction and sustainable for long periods of time, the production of such materials are dependent on various chemicals; this added step removes additional resources from the environment. An alternative to this is the usage of recycled materials. The tiny homes designed by a group in Texas consciously avoid using new materials in their construction. Because 30–40% of energy consumption is expended by human beings, it has been argued that infrastructure is best fit to include the consumption of humans within its blueprints.

Individuals who live in tiny homes are directly connected to the environment primarily because of the close proximity between tiny homes and the surrounding ecosystems. Through constant contact, the homeowner is given the opportunity to better understand the functions of nature. Such an understanding allows for an increase in environmental awareness.

More so, the design of tiny homes are subject to individual modification; the style, level of sustainability, intricacy, materials used, and modifications are all determined by homeowner preferences.

Environment and homelessness
Homelessness is a critical issue in the United States. According to the U.S. Department of Housing and Urban Development, about 550,000 individuals were experiencing homelessness on a given night in 2018. Over half of those individuals were able to sleep in different types of shelters while roughly thirty-five percent were unable to reside in a sheltered area. Despite the little information provided on this issue in popular media, homelessness has the capacity to affect the environment dramatically. According to the Environmental Council of Sacramento, homelessness is a contributor to environmental deterioration. For example, waste [litter, drug paraphernalia, etc.]  produced by the homeless accumulates around their living spaces which tend to be near waterways, sewage systems, or parks. This leads to the contamination of the surrounding ecosystem. The Environmental Council offers steps towards conserving the environment while simultaneously dealing with the issue of homelessness. These steps include the cleaning of various water systems and public spaces in order to provide both clean water and clean areas for all individuals of the community. One of these steps also includes governmental intervention in establishing sanitary and safe spaces for the homeless in order to prevent further environmental destruction. Luckily, systems for just that are beginning to form though the tiny house movement.

A critical form of combating chronic homelessness is the establishment of tiny house communities. Those behind such establishments aim to help individuals solve their housing problems and offer a space where individuals can connect with others who find themselves in similar circumstances. Creating these communities requires a variety of support, however the end goal is ultimately shared. The primary actors behind the building and funding of tiny homes for the homeless are non-profit organizations. Their goal is not only to give homeless people a place to live, but also offer them resources to help them in all aspects of their lives. Building communities of tiny homes for the homeless is a group effort involving the homeless, cities themselves, and housing patrons. Through their efforts, the issue of homelessness in itself, along with its effects on the environment, are being continuously combated and improved.

Media 
The tiny-house movement has inspired several reality television series:
 Living Big in a Tiny House (Web series)
 Mighty Tiny Houses (HGTV)
 Terrific Tiny Homes (DIY)
 Tiny House, Big Living (HGTV)
 Tiny House Builders (HGTV)
 Tiny House Hunters (HGTV)
 Tiny House Hunting (FYI)
 Tiny House Nation (FYI and A&E)
 Tiny House World (FYI)
 Tiny Luxury (HGTV)
 Tiny Paradise (HGTV)

See also

 Affordable housing
 Alternative housing
 Beach hut
 Construction trailer
 Cottage
 Earthship
 FIRE movement
 Friggebod
 Fulltiming
 Homestead principle
 Housetrucker
 Laneway house
 Log cabin
 Mobile home
 Modular building
 Optibo
 Perpetual traveler
 Recreational vehicles
 Shepherd's hut
 Shipping container architecture
 Shotgun house
 Simple living
 Summer house
 Vandwelling
 Vardo (Romani wagon)
 Yurt

References

Further reading

 Sarah Susanka, Kira Obolensky, The Not So Big House: A Blueprint for the Way We Really Live, Taunton (1998), 
 Lloyd Kahn and Bob Easton, Shelter, Shelter Publications (1973), 
 Ryan Mitchell, Tiny House Living:  Ideas For Building and Living Well In Less than 400 Square Feet, Betterway (2014), 
 Andrew Heben, Tent City Urbanism, The Village Collaborative (2014), 
 Vail, K. (2016). "Saving the American Dream: The Legalization of the Tiny House Movement". University of Louisville Law Review, 54(2), 357–379.
 Ford, J., & Gomez-Lanier, L. (2017). "Are Tiny Homes Here to Stay? A Review of Literature on the Tiny House Movement". Family And Consumer Sciences Research Journal, 45(4), 394–405. .
 Furst, A. (2017). Finding Space: Understanding How Planning Responds to Tiny Houses for Homeless Populations. Master's thesis. McGill University School of Urban Planning.
 Turner, C. (2017). "It Takes a Village: Designating 'Tiny House' Villages as Transitional Housing Campgrounds". University of Michigan Journal of Law Reform, 50(4), 931–954.

External links

 

House types
Simple living
Sustainable building